"From: Disco to: Disco" is a 1996 song recorded by German experimental house music project Whirlpool Productions. It is produced by Eric D. Clark, Justus Köhncke and Hans Nieswandt, and was released as the second single from their second album, Dense Music (1996). A huge hit in clubs, it reached number-one in Italy for nine weeks in the summer of 1997. Additionally, it also peaked at number 13 in Belgium and number 54 in the Netherlands. The accompanying music video was directed by Smoczek Policzek. Ten years later, in 2006, the song was released in a new version, as "From: Disco to: Disco 2006".

Critical reception
Pan-European magazine Music & Media wrote, "This German production is a killer dancefloor filler, as the Cologne-based house triumvirate radiate a real "Let's do-a-disco-pastiche!" feeling. Serious or not, Eric D. Clark, Justus Köhncke and Hans Niewandt have obviously hit the right key, as this single, taken from their second album Dense Music has already been a hit in Italy. In Holland, it is one of the favourite dance videos on music television channel TMF. Station head of music Erik Kross is enthusiastic about the track, but concedes: "It is a kind of 'love-it-or hate-it' track. A little resistance is always good, though, as it makes people talk about it." However, Kross predicts From Disco To Disco will be around for a while this summer. "Although it won't by far become as big a hit as Bellini's Samba De Janeiro," he suggests, "it has all the elements of a genuine sleeper."

Track listing
 12" single, Germany (1996)
"From: Disco to: Disco" (DJ Pierre's Wild Pitch Mix) – 9:22
"From: Disco to: Disco" (Album Version) – 5:58
"From: Disco to: Disco" (Extended Disco Mix) – 11:44

 CD single, Germany (1996)
"From: Disco to: Disco" (Single Mix) – 3:20
"From: Disco to: Disco" (Original Album Version) – 5:56

 CD maxi, UK & Europe (1996)
"From: Disco to: Disco" (Original Album Version) – 5:56
"From: Disco to: Disco" (Just Us Disco Mix) – 7:33
"From: Disco to: Disco" (The Whirlpool Disco Opera) – 11:44
"From: Disco to: Disco" (Arj Snoek) – 5:18
"From: Disco to: Disco" (DJ Pierre's Wild Pitch Mix) – 9:07

Charts

References

 

Songs about disco
1996 singles
1996 songs
Disco songs
House music songs
Number-one singles in Italy